Paul Wissaert (13 May 1885 – 5 July 1972) was a Belgian sculptor. His work was part of the sculpture event in the art competition at the 1936 Summer Olympics.

References

1885 births
1972 deaths
20th-century Belgian sculptors
20th-century male artists
Belgian sculptors
Olympic competitors in art competitions
Artists from Brussels